John Harry (1 August 1857 – 27 October 1919) was an Australian cricketer who played in one Test match  at Adelaide in 1895.

Harry was a talented batsman, bowler, fieldsman and wicket-keeper who played for the East Melbourne Cricket Club and represented Victoria from 1884 to 1897. He could throw strongly with either hand. His highest first-class score was 114 for Victoria against Western Australia in April 1893.

After top-scoring with 70 for Victoria against the touring English team in November 1894, Harry was selected to play in the Third Test in Adelaide a few weeks later. Australia won by a large margin, but he was not successful, and he never played another Test.

Harry was picked for the Australians' 1896 England tour but was replaced before the tour began, ostensibly because of a knee injury, but in fact because the rest of the team voted him out. He sued the Australasian Cricket Council, accepting an out-of-court settlement of £180.

Harry returned to Bendigo, where he had lived before his first-class cricket career, and resumed work as a miner. He contracted silicosis and died in October 1919, aged 62.

See also
 List of Victoria first-class cricketers

References

External links
 

1857 births
1919 deaths
Australia Test cricketers
Victoria cricketers
Sportspeople from Ballarat
Australian cricketers
Cricketers from Victoria (Australia)
Marylebone Cricket Club cricketers